William Gibson (16 February 1868 – 15 September 1911) was a Scottish footballer who played in the Football League for Lincoln City, Notts County and Sunderland, and in the Scottish Football League for Rangers, as a left back or left half.

Club career
Born into a coal mining family in Ayrshire, Gibson spent most of his early life in Wishaw. Having avoided more time down the pit when he signed for Sunderland from Cambuslang, he made his competitive debut for the Wearsiders on 27 October 1888 against Elswick Rangers in the FA Cup First Qualifying Round; his side won the match 5–3. He went on to make 100 league and cup appearances for Sunderland across two spells, scoring six goals, and played an important role in their consecutive Football League title winning seasons, with 20 appearances in 1891–92 and 30 in 1892–93.

During his one-year spell in Glasgow with Rangers, Gibson was selected for the Scottish Football League XI, believed to be his only representative honour. After a short second spell at Sunderland, he later won the Football League Second Division with Notts County in 1896–97 (promotion was secured via 'test matches' including a victory against Sunderland).

His younger sister Marion married Jimmy Miller, one of Sunderland's star forwards of the period (both also played for Rangers, but not at the same time).

References

1868 births
1911 deaths
Scottish footballers
Sunderland A.F.C. players
Association football wing halves
Cambuslang F.C. players
Rangers F.C. players
Notts County F.C. players
Bristol City F.C. players
Lincoln City F.C. players
Footballers from East Ayrshire
Sportspeople from Wishaw
English Football League players
Scottish Football League players
Scottish Football League representative players
Footballers from North Lanarkshire